Elevation Worship is a contemporary worship music collective from Elevation Church in Charlotte, North Carolina. The collective leads worship in weekend church services at Elevation Church, as well as performing concerts and tours around the United States. The collective has sold over 2.5 million albums in the United States.

History 

Elevation Worship began in 2007 at Elevation Church in Charlotte, North Carolina. The band released four independent albums prior to signing with Essential Records. The Sound was released in 2007 (under the name Elevation Church Live), We Are Alive in 2008, God With Us in 2009, and Kingdom Come in 2010. Featuring the song "Give Me Faith", Kingdom Come was the band's first album to break through on the Billboard charts, reaching No. 5 on Heatseekers, No. 42 on Independent Albums and at No. 17 on the Christian Albums chart.

The band released their debut studio album, For the Honor, under Sony Music Nashville's Essential Records label on November 21, 2011. It saw chart success on Billboard magazine charts, including No. 1 on Heatseekers, No. 19 on the Christian Albums, and the Billboard 200 at No. 193. Mack Brock is the best singer and most successful artist of Elevation Worship. As a successful singer, he decided to quit Elevation for a life where he didn’t have to be on tour all the time.

The band's second album under the Essential label, Nothing Is Wasted, was released on February 19, 2013. A deluxe edition of the album also included studio recordings of each song. It also saw chart success – reaching No. 1 on the Christian Albums chart and at No. 41 on the Billboard 200.

Their seventh album, Only King Forever, was released on January 14, 2014, debuting at their highest charting position, No. 23 on the Billboard 200 and featured guest vocalist Darlene Zschech from Hillsong Worship.

On August 1, 2014, the band recorded their eighth album, Wake Up the Wonder, live at the Spectrum in Charlotte. It was released on November 25 that same year. The album debuted at No. 58 on the Billboard 200 in its first week, as well as No. 1 on Billboards Christian Album chart. On July 31, 2015, they held another live recording at Time Warner Cable Arena for their ninth album, Here as in Heaven, their first album released on their own label, Elevation Worship Records. It was released on February 5, 2016, and peaked No. 1 on US album charts. Their tenth album, There Is a Cloud, was released on March 17, 2017, after being recorded at Elevation Ballantyne during the church's revival, "Code Orange Revival". After There is a Cloud, Elevation Worship released their first Spanish album, Lo Harás Otra Vez, on August 18, 2017. This album peaked at No. 2 on the US Latin album chart. On September 28, 2018, Elevation Worship released their eleventh live album, Hallelujah Here Below, which was nominated for the 2019 Best Contemporary Christian Music Album. On April 12, 2019, Elevation Worship released Paradoxology, which was a reimagined album with different takes on the songs from Hallelujah Here Below, like "Here Again", "Echo", and "Won't Stop Now". Paradoxology included a single, "With You". Aleluya (En La Tierra) is Elevation Worship's second album in Spanish and was released on July 19, 2019. It peaked at eight on US Latin Album Sales. At Midnight, their seventh EP, was released on August 30, 2019.
Graves Into Gardens, the group’s twelfth album, was released on May 1, 2020. The album debuted at No. 1 on Billboard’s Christian albums chart and No. 34 on the Billboard 200.
On April 30, 2021, Elevation Worship collaborated with Maverick City Music to release Old Church Basement. Old Church Basement debuted at No. 1 on Billboard’s Christian Albums chart and No. 30 on Billboard 200. Their live album, LION, released on March 4, 2022, debuted at No. 2 on the Billboard Christian Albums chart and No. 80 on the Billboard 200.

They have previously toured with other contemporary worship or contemporary Christian acts including Hillsong Worship, Lauren Daigle, Bethel Music, Passion, Casting Crowns, Kari Jobe, and Cody Carnes.

Members
Members include:

 Chris Brown
 Jonsal Barrientes
 Jenna Barrientes
 Tiffany Hudson
 Davide Mutendji
Isaiah Templeton

Past members

 Mack Brock
 London Gatch
 Matthews Ntlele
 Anna Sailors Pinkham
Jane Williams

Discography

Independent albums

Live albums

Other albums

Extended plays

Singles

As a lead artist

As a featured artist

Promotional singles

Other charted songs

Awards and nominations

American Music Awards 

|-
| 2021
| Elevation Worship
| Favorite Artist – Contemporary Inspirational
| 
|}

BET Awards

!Ref.
|-
| 2022
| "Jireh" 
| Dr. Bobby Jones Best Gospel/Inspirational Award
| 
| 
|}

Billboard Music Awards 

|-
| rowspan="3" | 2018
| Elevation Worship
| Top Christian Artist
| 
|-
| There Is a Cloud
| Top Christian Album
| 
|-
| "O Come to the Altar"
| Top Christian Song
| 
|-
| 2020
| Elevation Worship
| Top Christian Artist
| 
|-
| rowspan="4" | 2021
| Elevation Worship
| Top Christian Artist
| 
|-
| Graves into Gardens
| Top Christian Album
| 
|-
| "Graves into Gardens" 
| rowspan="2" | Top Christian Song
| 
|-
| "The Blessing" 
| 
|-
| rowspan="5" | 2022
| rowspan="2" | Elevation Worship
| Top Christian Artist
| 
|-
| Top Gospel Artist
| 
|-
| rowspan="2" | Old Church Basement 
| Top Christian Album
| 
|-
| Top Gospel Album
| 
|-
| "Jireh" 
| Top Gospel Song
| 
|}

GMA Dove Awards 

|-
| 2015
| Wake Up the Wonder
| Long Form Video of the Year
| 
|-
| 2016
| Here as in Heaven
| Worship Album of the Year
| 
|-
| rowspan="4" | 2017
| rowspan="2" | "O Come to the Altar"
| Song of the Year
| 
|-
| Worship Song of the Year
| 
|-
| There Is a Cloud
| Worship Album of the Year
| 
|-
| There Is a Cloud Live
| Long Form Video of the Year
| 
|-
| 2018
| "Do It Again"
| Worship Song of the Year
| 
|-
| rowspan="2" | 2019
| rowspan="2" | Hallelujah Here Below
| Worship Album of the Year
| 
|-
| Recorded Music Packaging of the Year
| 
|-
| rowspan="4" | 2020
| "See a Victory"
| Song of the Year
| 
|-
| Aleluya (En La Tierra)
| Spanish Language Album of the Year
| 
|-
| "The Blessing (Live)" 
| Worship Recorded Song of the Year
| 
|-
| At Midnight
| Worship Album of the Year
| 
|-
| rowspan="9" | 2021
| "Graves into Gardens" 
| rowspan="2" | Song of the Year
| 
|-
| "The Blessing" 
| 
|-
| Elevation Worship
| Artist of the Year
| 
|-
| "Tumbas A Jardines" 
| Spanish Language Recorded Song of the Year
| 
|-
| "Graves into Gardens" 
| rowspan="2" | Worship Recorded Song of the Year
| 
|-
| "Jireh" 
| 
|-
| Graves into Gardens
| rowspan="2" | Worship Album of the Year
| 
|-
| Old Church Basement 
| 
|-
| Graves into Gardens
| Recorded Music Packaging of the Year
| 
|-
| rowspan="2" | 2022
| rowspan="2" | Lion
| Worship Album of the Year
| 
|-
| Recorded Music Packaging of the Year
| 
|-
|}

Grammy Awards 

!
|-
| 2019
| Hallelujah Here Below
| Best Contemporary Christian Music Album
| 
| rowspan="5" | 
|-
| 2021
| "The Blessing"
| Best Contemporary Christian Music Performance/Song
| 
|-
| rowspan="3" | 2022
| "Wait on You" 
| Best Gospel Performance/Song
| 
|-
| "Jireh"
| Best Contemporary Christian Music Performance/Song
| 
|-
| Old Church Basement 
| Best Contemporary Christian Music Album
| 
|-
| 2023
| Lion
| Best Contemporary Christian Music Album
| 
| 
|}

Notes

References

External links
 

Musical groups established in 2007
Essential Records (Christian) artists
Musical groups from North Carolina
Performers of contemporary worship music
American Christian musical groups